Julius Edgar Barbosa Arp (August 15, 1919 – October 5, 1996) was an Olympic breaststroke swimmer from Brazil, who participated at one Summer Olympics for his native country. At the 1936 Summer Olympics in Berlin, he swam the 200-metre breaststroke, not reaching the finals.

References

1919 births
1996 deaths
Swimmers at the 1936 Summer Olympics
Olympic swimmers of Brazil
Brazilian male breaststroke swimmers
Swimmers from Rio de Janeiro (city)